The 2016–17 Treća HNL season is the 26th since its establishment.

The league consists of three regional groups, Istok (East), Jug (South) and Zapad (West).

Overview before the season
50 teams will join the league, including two relegated from the 2015–16 Druga HNL and five promoted from the lower leagues.

Relegated from 2015–16 Druga HNL
Segesta (Druga HNL→Treća HNL West)
Zadar (Druga HNL→Treća HNL South)

Promoted from 2015–16 Treća HNL
Novigrad (Treća HNL West→Druga HNL)
Solin (Treća HNL South→Druga HNL)

Relegated from 2015–16 Treća HNL
Mladost Antin (Treća HNL East→Inter-county league of East)
Podravina (Treća HNL East→Inter-county league of North−Group Čakovec-Varždin)
Špansko (Treća HNL West→Inter-county league of Center)
Zagora (Treća HNL South→First League of Šibenik-Knin county)
Mosor (Treća HNL South→First League of Split-Dalmatia county)

Promoted from 2015–16 Inter-county leagues and County leagues

Bedem Ivankovo (Inter-county league of East→Treća HNL East)
Kustošija (Inter-county league of Center→Treća HNL West)
Jadran Poreč (Inter-county league of West→Treća HNL West)
Orkan (First League of Split-Dalmatia county→Treća HNL South)
GOŠK Dubrovnik 1919 (First League of Dubrovnik-Neretva county→Treća HNL South)

Group

East

Stadia and locations

League table

Results

South

Stadia and locations

League table

Results

West

Stadia and locations

League table

Results

References

1
2016–17 in European third tier association football leagues
Second Football League (Croatia)